Tatu, or t.A.T.u., was a Russian pop music girl duo.

Tatu may also refer to:

People
 Tatú (footballer, 1898-1932), full name Altino Marcondes, Brazilian footballer
 Tatu (soccer) (Antonio Carlos Pecorari, born 1962), a Brazilian footballer
 Tatu Baby (born 1987), American tattoo artist
 Tatu Chionga (born 1944), a Malawian boxer
 Tatu Kolehmainen (1885–1967), a Finnish long-distance runner 
 Tatu Mäkelä (born 1988), a Finnish footballer
 Tatu Malmivaara (1908–1987), a Finnish clergyman and politician
 Tatu Miettunen (born 1995), a Finnish footballer
 Tatu Nissinen (1883–1966), a Finnish agronomist and politician
 Tatu Vanhanen (1929–2015), a Finnish political scientist and author
 Tatu Varmanen (born 1998), a Finnish footballer
 Cornel Tatu (born 1983), a Romanian rugby player 
 Leandro Tatu (Leandro Ângelo Martins, born 1982), a Brazilian footballer
 Utpal S. Tatu (born 1964), an Indian biologist

Places 
 Ţaţu, Cornereva, Romania
 Tatu River, or Dadu River, in Taiwan
 Khanbaliq, or Tatu or Dadu, capital of the Yuan dynasty in present day Beijing, China

Other uses
 Tatu (film), a 2017 Nigerian adventure film 
 Tatu (instrument), or Charango, a small Andean stringed instrument of the lute family
 Tatu, the name of a chimpanzee at the Chimpanzee and Human Communication Institute

See also

 Dadu (disambiguation)
 Tattoo, a form of body modification
 Giant armadillo (Priodontes maximus), colloquially tatou